Bruno Ceccobelli (born 2 September 1952) is an Italian painter and sculptor. He currently resides and works in Todi, Italy. Ceccobelli was one of the six artists of the Nuova Scuola Romana or Scuola di San Lorenzo, an artistic movement that grew out of the Arte Povera and Transavanguardia movements of the latter twentieth century.

Life 

He wrote: "I do not want to be a market-fan artist, but to belong to all times, and this is why I believe in a foreseeing art, not just historical or literary or sociological or stylistic. I believe in a symbolic art, capable to offer a message and to pacify the world".  In 1975, he first took part in a group exhibition in the Town Hall of Albach, Austria, and, two years later, he had his first solo exhibition at the Alternative Space Gallery in Rome, where he exhibited works of conceptual art. He also participated in two group exhibitions at La Stanza, an independent space self-managed by young artists.

In the early 1980s, Ceccobelli and other artists settled in the former Pastificio Cerere, a large abandoned industrial space located in the San Lorenzo quarter in Rome. The group, known as the New Roman School or San Lorenzo Workshop, included Piero Pizzi Cannella, Marco Tirelli, Giuseppe Gallo, Gianni Dessì, Nunzio Di Stefano and Domenico Bianchi. The Italian art critic Achille Bonito Oliva wrote that these artists were "all bearers of individual poetics and all streams towards a common aesthetic mentality and a moral vision of art".

In the following years he had a number of international exhibitions: in 1979, at the Festival of Italian Culture in Belgrade and, subsequently, group exhibitions in France, Germany, and Croatia. At Yvon Lambert in Paris he exhibited Morpheus.

The 1990s started with exhibitions in Germany, Austria, Canada and Italy. In 1994 he was invited to give a training course at the Ecole Nationale des Beaux-Artes in Senegal, an experience that would leave a deep influence in his life. 

In 1999 Arturo Schwarz is the curator of Ceccobelli's exhibition “Trascorsi d’Asfalto” at the Guastalla Centro Arte Gallery (Livorno) and in the same year he exhibits in Bilbao (Luis Borgus)

During the Jubilee Year (2000) he is entrusted with the realization of the huge portals in iron corten and bronze for the Cathedral of Terni, in Italy.

In 2002 Ceccobelli celebrates at the B.M.B. Gallery his twenty years of exhibitions in Dutch Galleries.

The next year he publishes the book Color Bellezza, a collection of his essays expressing his longing for a forthcoming aesthetic society. Also in 2005 he holds his important solo-exhibition “Classico Eclettico” at the Archeological Museum of Villa Adriana in Tivoli (Roma).

In 2004 Ceccobelli realizes the mosaic “Eternity is the true healer” in Gibellina (Sicily) and the year after the Guastalla Gallery in Livorno presents the anthological exhibition “Big Works 1989-2005”. In the same year he writes the book Tempo senza tempo della pittura, which is a collection of comparisons about yesterday's and today's artists, an opportunity to theorize his aesthetical arguments.

In 2005 he is appointed as Director of the Academy of fine arts “Pietro Vannucci” of Perugia, Italy.

In 2006 Ceccobelli presents a series of marble sculptures in Verona and in Pietrasanta at the gallery Spirale Arte, and participates in the important group exhibition “San Lorenzo” at Villa Medici (Roma).

Among the most recent exhibitions to be noted are “Longa Marcia post-temporale” (Volume! Roma 2007), “Invasi” (Fondazione Pastificio Cerere, Roma), “Attici unici” (Attico of Fabio Sargentini, Roma 2009), and the impressive “Natalis in Urbe” (Basilica di Santa Maria Sopra Minerva, Roma 2009).

Also in 2009, the Museum of Contemporary Art (MaRT) of Rovereto presented the first retrospective exhibition dedicated to the Officina San Lorenzo, which traced the history of that group. The exhibition catalogue, was published by Silvana Editorale and edited by Daniela Lancioni.

In 2010 he takes part of the group-exhibition at the Limen 895 Gallery “San Lorenzo, la soglia del’arte”, curated by Achille Bonito Oliva (Roma) and is in the 16th Biennale of contemporary sacred art organized by the Italian Foundation Staurós (Isola del Gran Sasso).
Also to be remembered is the exhibition “In carta sogni. Works on Paper 1980-2010”, organized  by R. Rodriguez, at the Museum of Abruzzo People (Pescara 2010), which, for the first time ever, shows Ceccobelli's main graphic works.
In the same year the Anfiteatro Arte Gallery (Padova) organizes the retrospective “Early Works”, which gives a survey of the extraordinary period between 1982 and 1992.
In 2010 Ceccobelli publishes  his third book, Gratiaplena. Economia della grazia, which contains his spiritual legacy in the form of a collection of inspired writings on aesthetic and society.

Among the numerous events in 2011, we must cite the exhibition “Schöne Träume” (Rovereto), in which the artist tries to capture the beauty of the dreams impressed on pillow cases. It is also the year of the participation in the important exhibition “Grandi opere…grandi” at the Marconi Foundation (Milan) and in the Lazio Stand at the Venice Biennale (curated by Vittorio Sgarbi).

In 2012 Ceccobelli presents his solo-exhibition “Eroi d’Eros” (Catania), which collects 101 erotic drawings, then at the Museum of modern Art in Buenos Aires, Argentina (2013).
Among the group-exhibitions we point out the show held at the Galerie Placido (Paris), in which he is presented together with his friends Dessì, Nunzio, Gallo, Pizzi and Cannella.
In Padova, October 2012, he sets up “Con passi Dorati” (at the oratorio di San Rocco) a site specific show supported by Padova Council hall.

In 2013 an important solo-exhibition is “209-Icona from NYC”, in Novara in the gallery Nunzio Sorrenti with small works from the '80.
“Gli anni '70 a Roma”, organised by Daniela Lancioni and presented at the Palazzo delle Esposizioni di Roma is the group-exhibition that closes the year 2013.
 
In 2014 the solo exhibitions are: “Summa Felix” in Cosenza at the Vertigo Arte Cultural Association, full of his pictorial well known symbols; furthermore “Terra Cotta” at the municipal space La Rinascente in Padova, with an anthology on the twenty-years production of his ceramics, and with the participation of his sons Auro and Celso; and "Port'Ostensorio" at the Susanna Orlando gallery in Pietrasanta with some consecrated host-shaped paintings blessed by art.
In December 2014 a collective "Fuoco nero" - Materia e struttura attorno e dopo Burri, organised by A. C. Quintavalle, presented at the Scuderie in Pilotta, Parma.

In 2015, the solo exhibition "Capovolgere" – l’ABC Ceccobelli”, an exhibition at the Pastificio Cerere Foundation in Rome, divided into two parts: "Pupille" with works on mirrored bitumen; "Ritratti di bandiera" a six-handed work with his sons Auro and Celso.

Still in 2015 a collective exhibition in Sant'Etien organized by the VOLUME! Foundation, at the Museum of Modern Art: "Arte Contemporanea".
In 2016 the exhibition "Icons", curated by Cicno G. G. Edizioni, a solo exhibition at the Academy of Saint Petersburg in Russia, with works dedicated to the Byzantine classical tradition; and always in 2016 in Ravenna, at the National Museum and at the Basilica of Sant'Apollinare in Classe: "Ceccobelli and the icons of the Classense Collection".

"Con sorti Belli" is another personal exhibition, presented in Rome at the Augusto Consorti Gallery.

In 2017 the exhibitions are: "Autoritratti da dentro" – La ceramica prende forma, in luster ceramics curated by Marco Tonelli, at the Palazzo Podestarile in Montelupo Fiorentino; and the exhibition "Undisclosed stories", curated by Davide Sarchioni and Maria Concetta Monaci, in Capalbio, at the Palazzo Collacchioni.

In 2018 he takes part in the collective "Challenging Beauty - Insights in Italian Contemporary Art", curated by Lorand Hegyi, in the Parkview Museum in Singapore; "Painting after post-modernism" curated by Barbara Rose, in the fabulous Royal Palace of Caserta; “La Scuola di San Lorenzo. Una Factory romana”, at the Museo Carisj, in Jesi; and “Al passo con la Costituzione”, at the Central State Archive, in Rome; while among the personal exhibitions we enumerate the great site-specific installation "T'odi" curated by D. Lancioni, at the “Sala delle Pietre” in Todi and at the same time “Primo segno – Recente sogno”, at the Bibo's Place Gallery, in Todi.

In 2019 his works are shown at the following group exhibitions: ”Collezione Farnesina”, India Art Fair, Nuova Delhi, then traveling: Calcutta e Mumbai;“Unforgettable Umbria” Baldeschi  Palace, curated by the Cassa di Risparmio Foundation in Perugia;“25 libri 25 artisti”, Williamson Gallery, Los Angeles (USA) curated by P. Varroni; and the solo exhibitions: ”Doppia Luce”, at the Galleria E3 Arte Contemporanea in Brescia and “MORMORIIMARMOREI”, at the Museo Collicola, in conjunction with the 62° Spoleto Festival curated by M. Tonelli.

Publications 

Ceccobelli's writings have been collected into four books:

L'arte del possibile reale, ed. by L. Marucci, Stamperia dell'Arancio, Grottammare-Ascoli Piceno 1994;
Color Bellezza, ed. by N. Micieli, Il Grandevetro-Jaca Book, Pisa 2002;
Tempo senza tempo della pittura, De Luca Editori d'Arte, Roma 2005;
Gratiaplena. Economia della grazia, ed. by M. Bastianelli, Effe Fabrizio Fabbri Editore, Perugia 2008, 2011.

Museums and private collections 

The Museum of Modern Art (MOMA) - New York
Museum Moderner Kunst Stiftung Ludwig (mumok) - Vienna
Museo d'Arte Contemporanea di Roma (MACRO) - Roma
Museum of Fine Arts, Boston - Boston
Groninger Museum - Groningen
Palazzo della Farnesina - Collezione Farnesina Experimenta - Rome
Museo di Portofino - Portofino
Museo dello Splendore
Collezione Maramotti - Reggio Emilia
Fabbrica Borroni
Merano Arte im Haus der Sparkasse
Collezione Banca Intesa San Paolo
Collezione Unicredit Group
Maon - Museo dell'Arte dell'Otto e del Novecento
Banca di Credito Cooperativo di Calcio e Covo
 La Serpara, Civitella d’Agliano, Italy
 Maon - Museo dell'Arte dell'Otto e del Novecento http://www.maon.it
 Banca di Credito Cooperativo di Calcio e Covo https://web.archive.org/web/20141129083249/http://www.bcccalciocovo.it/template/default.asp?i_menuID=19792
 Cassino Museo Arte Contemporane http://www.camusac.com/dettcollezioni-Ceccobelli_Bruno/3_191/ita/
 Fondazione de Fornaris http://www.fondazionedefornaris.org/artworks/category/ceccobelli-bruno.html

References

Further reading 

O. Celestino, 11 Storie. Pastificio Cerere andata e ritorno, Carlo Cambi Editore, Poggibonsi 2007.
D. Lancioni (a cura), Italia Contemporanea. Officina San Lorenzo, texts by G. Belli, A. Bonito Oliva, D. Lancioni, F. Bacci,  N. De Pisapia and M. De Pilati. With a bibliographical apparatus by P. Bonani; catalogue of the exhibition at the Museum Mart in Rovereto, from 16 May to 27 September 2009; Silvana Editoriale, Milan 2009.
D. Guzzi, Sul filo della memoria, ENPALS-Editori Laterza, Bari 2010.
G. Gigliotti, Sei storie. Tirelli, Pizzi Cannella, Ceccobelli, Nunzio, Gallo, Dessì, Edizioni Carte Segrete, Rome 2011.

External links 
Fondazione Pastificio Cerere
Bruno Ceccobelli Home Page
 Ceccobelli photographed by Pino Settanni
 Ceccobelli photographed by Mimmo Capone
 Ceccobelli photographed by  Sandro Vannini 
  Ceccobelli on Pope Benedetto XVI (Video by Auro and Celso Ceccobelli)

1952 births
Living people
20th-century Italian painters
Italian male painters
Art Informel and Tachisme painters
Italian contemporary artists
People from Todi
Umbrian painters
20th-century Italian sculptors
20th-century Italian male artists
Italian male sculptors
21st-century Italian sculptors
21st-century Italian male artists